Levicar was a concept car Ford displayed in 1959. It was a one-person, small in a modern sense, car propelled by maglev. The car was designed to be levitated by magnets, and was intended to be developed for high-speed transportation systems. The Levicar was very light and when raised off its guide rail by the magnetics it only required a blower in the back to propel it. A working model was actually built. While technically a success, the whole project was dropped due to financial constraints.

References

External links 
 Article in Business Week 
 Car Styling

Ford concept vehicles
Maglev